The 1974–75 Michigan Stags/Baltimore Blades season was the third season of the former Los Angeles Sharks franchise. Prior to the season, the team relocated to Detroit, and then relocated to Baltimore partway through the season. The team finished fifth in the Western Division and did not qualify for the playoffs.

Offseason

Regular season

Final standings

Michigan Stags Game log

Baltimore Blades Game log

Player stats

Note: Pos = Position; GP = Games played; G = Goals; A = Assists; Pts = Points; +/- = plus/minus; PIM = Penalty minutes; PPG = Power-play goals; SHG = Short-handed goals; GWG = Game-winning goals
      MIN = Minutes played; W = Wins; L = Losses; T = Ties; GA = Goals-against; GAA = Goals-against average; SO = Shutouts;

Awards and records

Transactions

Draft picks
Michigan's draft picks at the 1974 WHA Amateur Draft.

Farm teams

See also
1974–75 WHA season

References

External links

Mich
Mich